The Wife of Forty Years (German: Die Frau von vierzig Jahren) is a 1925 German silent drama film directed by Richard Oswald and starring Diana Karenne, Vladimir Gajdarov and Sig Arno. The film's art direction was by Paul Leni.

Cast
 Diana Karenne as die Frau 
 Vladimir Gajdarov as Er 
 Sig Arno as Der Hausfreund
 Paul Otto as Der Mann 
 Dina Gralla as die Tochter

References

Bibliography
 Kasten, Jürgen & Loacker, Armin. Richard Oswald: Kino zwischen Spektakel, Aufklärung und Unterhaltung. Verlag Filmarchiv Austria, 2005.

External links

1925 films
Films of the Weimar Republic
German silent feature films
Films directed by Richard Oswald
German black-and-white films
German drama films
1925 drama films
Silent drama films
1920s German films